Gilles Brisson (born 9 April 1958) is a French former professional football player and manager. As a player, he was a defender. He notably played for Paris Saint-Germain, Toulouse, and Sochaux.

Personal life 
Gilles is the twin brother of François, who is also a former footballer. They played together at Paris Saint-Germain.

Honours

Player 
Sochaux
 Division 2: 1987–88
Coupe de France runner-up: 1987–88

Manager 
Rochefort
 Division d'Honneur Centre-Ouest: 1999–2000

References

External links 
 

1958 births
Living people
People from Saintes, Charente-Maritime
French footballers
French football managers
Association football defenders
Paris Saint-Germain F.C. players
Toulouse FC players
Paris FC players
FC Sochaux-Montbéliard players
USL Dunkerque players
Canet Roussillon FC players
Ligue 1 players
Ligue 2 players
French Division 3 (1971–1993) players
French Division 4 (1978–1993) players
Montauban FCTG managers
Sportspeople from Charente-Maritime
Footballers from Nouvelle-Aquitaine